This is a list of members of the Solomon Islands National Parliament who died in office.

List

References

Solomon Islands Parliament
Members of the National Parliament of the Solomon Islands
Parliament